Christopher Robert Ziemann (born September 20, 1976) is a former American football offensive tackle. He played college football at Michigan, where he was part of the 1997 national championship team. Professionally, Ziemann played for the New York Giants of the NFL and Rhein Fire of NFL Europe.

Early life and college career
A native of Aurora, Illinois, Ziemann graduated from Waubonsie Valley High School in 1995. At the University of Michigan, Ziemann played at defensive end, right guard, and right tackle for Michigan Wolverines football from 1996 to 1999 after redshirting the 1995 season. Having switched from defensive end to offensive line during spring camp, he was the starting right guard for the undefeated 1997 Michigan Wolverines football team that won the school's first national championship in 50 years. Ziemann graduated from Michigan with a degree in sports management communication.

Professional career
Because of ankle injuries suffered while he was in college, Zieman was not drafted in the 2000 NFL Draft. Despite not being drafted, Ziemann signed with the New York Giants and played eight games with the Giants in 2000 before a season-ending ACL injury in late October. During his time in the NFL, Zieman was 6 feet, 7 inches tall and weighed 315 pounds. He spent the 2001 season with the Giants practice squad.

He signed with the Jacksonville Jaguars in February 2002, but he spent the 2002 season on injured reserve. In May 2003, Ziemann was waived by the Jaguars.

In February 2004, Ziemann was signed by the Tampa Bay Buccaneers and allocated to the NFL Europe team Rhein Fire. With the Fire, Ziemannn played in 10 games with nine starts at right tackle. Ziemann was released by the Buccaneers in July 2004.

Notes

1976 births
Living people
Michigan Wolverines football players
New York Giants players
Jacksonville Jaguars players
Tampa Bay Buccaneers players
Rhein Fire players
Players of American football from Illinois
Sportspeople from Aurora, Illinois
American football offensive tackles
American football offensive guards
American football defensive ends